Boy Machine is a Swedish comedy series that started airing on October 16, 2015 on TV4. The series follows the story of a fictitious boyband called Boy Machine. An extremely popular boyband in the 1990s, the now much older men try to make a comeback. Besides friction within the group they also encounter competition from a young boyband duo called Stargaze.

Cast Members
 Peter Magnusson
 Jonas Karlsson
 Henrik Dorsin
 David Wiberg
 Karan Exclusive
 Emma Peters
 Jonna Delvert
 Shima Niavarani

References

Swedish comedy television series